Golf Challenge is a 1982 video game written by Harold Schwab for the Atari 8-bit family and published by Sierra On-Line.

Gameplay
Golf Challenge is a game which golf is played using a joystick.

Reception
Stanley Greenlaw reviewed the game for Computer Gaming World, and stated that "The graphics of GC are the best of the games reviewed here. While less a serious simulation [...] GC has a charm all  own as a video-style golf game."

References

External links
Addison-Wesley Book of Atari Software 1984
Review in PC Magazine
Review in Electronic Games

1982 video games
Atari 8-bit family games
Atari 8-bit family-only games
Golf video games
Sierra Entertainment games
Video games developed in the United States